The M777 howitzer is a British towed 155 mm artillery piece in the howitzer class. It is used by the ground forces of Australia, Canada, Colombia, India, Saudi Arabia, Ukraine, and the United States. It was first used in combat during the US war in Afghanistan.

The M777 is manufactured by BAE Systems' Global Combat Systems division. Prime contract management is based in Barrow-in-Furness in the United Kingdom as well as manufacture and assembly of the titanium structures and associated recoil components. Final integration and testing of the weapon is undertaken at BAE's facility in Hattiesburg, Mississippi. Depending on the year, contract and systems package, the M777 has been exported for individual unit costs including US$2.025 million (in 2008) and $3.738 million (in 2017)

Design

The M777 began in 1987 as the Ultralight Field Howitzer (UFH), developed by Vickers Shipbuilding and Engineering's (VSEL) Armaments Division in Barrow-in-Furness, UK. VSEL was bought by BAE Systems after the UFH prototypes had been manufactured and demonstrated, and consequently BAE became responsible for future design refinements and renamed the gun "M777". Upon taking over responsibility for the weapon, BAE "Americanized" to a large degree the construction and assembly through its US-based BAE Systems Land and Armaments group. The M777 now uses about 70% US-built parts including the gun barrel, which is manufactured at the Watervliet Arsenal.

Much of the weight reduction is due to the extensive use of titanium. The gun barrel serves as the towing bar, with the connecting ring forged as a projection of the muzzle brake. The minimum gun crew required is five, compared to a previous nine. The normal crew is eight. With a minimal emergency crew, the rate of fire is decreased.

The M777A1 and M777A2 use a digital fire-control system similar to that found on self-propelled howitzers such as the M109A6 Paladin to provide navigation, pointing and self-location, allowing it to be put into action quickly. 

The Canadian M777 in conjunction with the traditional "glass and iron sights/mounts" uses a digital fire control system called the Digital Gun Management System (DGMS) produced by Leonardo MW with components of the Indirect Fire Control Software Suite (IFCSS) built by the Firepower team in the Canadian Army Land Software Engineering Centre. The Leonardo MW portion of the system, known as LINAPS, had been proven previously through earlier use on the British Army 105 mm L118 Light Gun.

This was the longest operational shot in the history of the M777 howitzer, and the longest operational barrel artillery shot in history for the Marine Corps.

Usually a barrel on a modern artillery system, like the M777, must be replaced after firing up to 2,500 rounds.

Variants

 M777 – gun with optical fire control
 M777A1 – digitization upgrades, with the addition of an onboard power source, satellite global positioning, inertial navigation, radio, Gun Display Unit (GDU) and Section Chief Assembly (SCA).
 M777A2 – Block 1A software upgrade. Addition of an Enhanced Portable Inductive Artillery Fuze Setter (EPIAFS) to enable Excalibur and precision munition compatibility.
Modified with a longer 55-caliber,  barrel and supercharged propellant firing the XM1113 rocket-assisted projectile.
 M777C1 – M777 with DGMS (Canada)

Ammunition

 M982 Excalibur
 M1128 projectile
 XM1113
 M549A1

Service history

Australia

In 2008, the Australian Defence Force made a US Foreign Military Sales request for 57 M777A2s worth an estimated US$248m. Subsequently, 35 guns were purchased for the Australian Army. to re-equip the 1st Regiment, Royal Australian Artillery, the 4th Regiment, Royal Australian Artillery, and the 8th/12th Regiment, Royal Australian Artillery, to replace 155 mm M198s and 105 mm L119 Light Guns. The first deliveries of M777A2 began in late 2010.

An additional 19 guns will be bought directly from American production lines to enable a total of six batteries. Concurrently, the Australian Army has acquired guided 155 mm munitions in the form of the M982 Excalibur and XM1156 Precision Guidance Kit. In late April 2022, Australia announced that they would donate six of their M777 howitzers, with ammunition, to aid in the defence of Ukraine during the 2022 Russian invasion of Ukraine.

Brazil
In 2010, The Brazilian Navy evaluated the 155 mm M777 as a candidate to replace the six 155 mm M114A1 howitzers of the Marine Corps branch. The successor to the M114 has not yet been chosen.

Canada

In December 2005, 1st Regiment, Royal Canadian Horse Artillery, conducted an inaugural firing of its first 155 mm M777 towed howitzers, for a total of six guns. The six guns delivered were supplied by the United States Marine Corps under a Foreign Military Sales (FMS) contract between the U.S. and Canada. The Canadian guns were first fired by A Battery, 1 RCHA, at CFB Shilo and then were deployed to Afghanistan in support of Operation Archer. They were put into service in the Canadian anti-terror operations around Kandahar in early 2006, marking the first use of the M777 in combat operations.

In the summer, they made a significant contribution during the Battle of Panjwaii when a small number of rounds were used to huge effect on Taliban elements retreating from the battle area. Many of the 72 reported killed during the heaviest period of fighting were due to artillery fire from only two of these guns. In late fall of 2006, the Canadian M777 howitzers were equipped with the Digital Gun Management System (DGMS), which greatly improved accuracy and led to these guns being used for short range close support of Canadian and US ground forces.

They proved so successful that an order for an additional six guns was placed with BAE. In May 2009, the Canadian government ordered a further 25 M777s, bringing the total to 37. The DGMS is also being improved with integrated communications. On 22 April 2022, Canada sent four of their M777 howitzers, with ammunition, to Ukraine to aid in the defense of Ukraine during the 2022 Russian invasion of Ukraine.

India
Purchase plans were overtaken when the procurement process was restarted in July 2010. India's Ministry of Defence cleared the proposal for buying 145 guns for US$660 million on 11 May 2012 through the US Government's Foreign Military Sales (FMS) process. This was put up before the Ministry of Finance for clearance and will subsequently be taken up by the Cabinet Committee on Security for final approval. On 2 August 2013, India requested the sale of 145 M777 howitzers for US$885 million.

In February 2014 the purchase was again postponed. In May 2014 the purchase was cleared by India's Ministry of Defence. In July 2014, the Government of India announced that it would not order the guns because of cost issues. In November 2014, the selection process was restarted under the "Make In India" program. In May 2015, the Ministry of Defence approved ₹29 billion (₹2,900 crore) to buy 145 M777 ultralight howitzers from the US. In December 2015, the Indian Ministry of Defence said it was keen on placing a follow-up order of 500 more M777 guns.

In June 2016, it was announced that 145 guns will be purchased by India for US$750 million. In November 2016 the Indian government completed the deal to buy 145 howitzers from the US. Under the agreement, BAE Systems supplied 25 ready-built howitzers, while 120 guns were manufactured in India by Mahindra Defence Systems Limited.

The Indian Army received its first shipment of two howitzers in 2017 from the United States in ready to use condition. In September 2017, the barrel of one of the howitzers was damaged while firing during calibration trials. The Indian army used the M777 howitzer in the Himvijay exercise in Arunachal Pradesh which involved the newly raised integrated battle groups.

A total of seven artillery regiments are planned, each of 18 guns. The first regiment is planned to be raised by the end of 2020 with 15 guns supplied by BAE systems and three guns supplied by Mahindra Defense Systems Limited. In July 2020, in the wake of escalating tension with China, further purchases of Excalibur shells were announced by the Indian Ministry of Defence.

Several of these howitzers were deployed in the Ladakh area and the north eastern state of Arunachal Pradesh at the border with China.

Ukraine
In April 2022, during the 2022 Russian invasion of Ukraine in the Russo-Ukraine War, the United States provided 108, Canada 4, and Australia 6 M777 howitzers with ammunition to the Ukrainian armed forces, to repel Russia. Canada promised 10 barrels to replace any worn out during firing. Usually a modern artillery system, like the M777, must have the barrel replaced after firing up to 2,500 rounds.

In October 2022, Ukraine was given an additional 16 M777 by the US, and  had at least 170. In November 2022, according to U.S. and Ukrainian officials, a third of the roughly 350 Western-made howitzers (including 142 M777s given by the US) donated to Ukraine are out of action at any given time. Those weapons are wearing out after months of overuse, or being damaged or destroyed in combat. As of 12 March 2023, Oryx verified that at least 43 M-777s have been lost in combat (34 destroyed, 9 damaged).

One Ukrainian crew claims to have fired 6,000 rounds through their M777. During this time they have had four barrel changes. All of these barrel replacements occurred before the limit of 2,500 rounds as they noticed accuracy was decreasing.

United States
The M777 succeeded the M198 howitzer in the United States Marine Corps and United States Army in 2005. In 2014 the US military began fielding several upgrades to its M777 howitzers including new liquid crystal display units, software updates, improved power systems, and muzzle sensors for onboard ballistic computing. Future upgrades include a touchscreen Chief Section Display, a new Mission System Computer, and a digital radio.

Army

The 18th Field Artillery Brigade (Airborne) at Fort Bragg, North Carolina, was the initial Army test bed unit for the XM777 which included the 1st and 3rd Battalions of the 321st Field Artillery Regiment. The initial prototypes were tested by 1st Battalion, 377th Air Assault Regiment, in 1998 also a unit of the 18th Field Artillery Brigade.

2nd Platoon, Bravo Battery, 2nd Battalion, 11th Field Artillery Regiment (2-11 FA), was the first US Army unit to fire the M777A in combat in January 2008 in support of Operation Iraqi Freedom. In June 2007, the M777 in its A2 configuration was assigned to the U.S. Army's 3-321 FA. It deployed to Afghanistan in support of Operation Enduring Freedom in December 2007 in January 2008 making the unit the first U.S. Army unit to utilise the M777 in combat in support of Operation Enduring Freedom. In April 2008, the M777 was deployed for testing with 2-8 FA at Fort Wainwright in Fairbanks, Alaska.

In July 2008, at Camp Shelby, Mississippi, 1-108 FA, 28th Infantry Division, Pennsylvania National Guard, became the first field artillery unit of the National Guard to field and fire the M777.

Two soldiers from 2-319 FA were killed from a breech explosion and other members of their gun crew were injured while attempting to fire a M777 at an ISIL mortar position in northern Iraq. Multiple firing incidents have occurred during training with the M777 including a fatal one in February 2014 with 3-321 FA and previously in 2011 with Marines from Camp Lejeune also at Fort Bragg.

In August 2017, two crewmen were killed and five others injured in an incident with a M777.

In May 2017, the US Army revealed it was buying the Swedish Bofors 155 Bonus round as an interim system as a result of the required phasing out of cluster munitions from artillery shells, complying with policy to achieve less than 1% unexploded ordnance from non-unitary explosives. The BONUS has two sensor-fused munitions deployed by a 155 mm carrier projectile that scan the ground for targets and fire explosively formed penetrators down from the air. The system has been tested from the M777 howitzer.

The 3rd Cavalry Regiment deployed multiple M777A2 guns to Firebase Saham in Iraq on the border with Syria from November 2018 to April 2019 to support the Syrian Democratic Forces in the Battle of Baghuz Fawqani, the ultimately successful operation to capture the final town held by ISIL.

Marine Corps

In May 2005, 3rd Battalion, 11th Marines, based at Marine Corps Air Ground Combat Center Twentynine Palms, became the first Marine unit to begin fielding the new M777. 580 guns were supplied to the Marines, and 421 to the U.S. Army and National Guard.

In March 2016, 200 Marines and four M777A2 howitzers from the 26th Marine Expeditionary Unit set up Firebase Bell, officially the Karasoar Counterfire Complex, near the Iraqi town of Makhmour, supporting the Iraqi Army's Mosul offensive. The firebase was only  from ISIL-controlled territory. One Marine was killed in a rocket attack on 19 March, just days after arriving.

Direct attacks on the base dropped off in the following weeks as the Iraqis captured surrounding villages. The Marine howitzers fired every day in support of Iraqi maneuvers, using high explosive, smoke, and illumination rounds. They were relieved by Army soldiers after roughly 60 days, after firing more than 2,000 rounds in 486 fire missions.

In March 2017, the 11th Marine Expeditionary Unit was deployed to Syria to provide artillery support with their M777s for forces seeking to eject ISIL forces from Raqqa.

Combat history
 Iraq War
 War in Afghanistan
 Military intervention against ISIL: Multiple M777A2 guns were deployed to Iraq on the border with Syria from 8 November 2018 to April 2019 to support the Syrian Democratic Forces in the Battle of Baghuz Fawqani, the ultimately successful operation to capture the final town held by the Islamic State group. They deployed to Firebase Saham, a base freshly constructed by the U.S. Army to provide fire support during the battle, especially during cloudy days when U.S. aircraft could not see to conduct airstrikes.
 2020–2022 China–India skirmishes: The Indian Army has apparently deployed multiple artillery platforms, including the M777 howitzers, along the Line of Actual Control or the border with China where the PLA and the Indian Army have been engaged in a stand-off for many months now.
 2022 Russian invasion of Ukraine: The U.S. has supplied 126 M777 howitzers to Ukraine as part of several military aid packages. Ukraine received 6 additional units from Australia and 4 from Canada, as well as 200,000 155mm rounds and 72 trucks to transport the guns, enough to supply six battalions. Ukrainian forces claim they need this weapon as their own artillery does not have the range of Russian systems, while the M777 has a range greater than Russian weapons.
 Ukrainian Brg. Gen. Volodomyr Karpenko said that M777 is prone to damage by shrapnel from incoming artillery fire. He said that ordinarily two out of six pieces in a typical M777-equipped Ukrainian artillery battery would require maintenance due to shrapnel damage after a typical incoming fire event. Russian forces claim to have seized a damaged and inoperable M777 during fighting in Siversk in eastern Ukraine.
 A Ukrainian officer said in October 2022 that while M777 has to be towed, and has a lower fire rate than the German Panzerhaubitze 2000 and French CAESAR, it is more accurate and easier to use. BAE stated that month that it was discussing with the United States restarting production of the weapon, after good performance in Ukraine and lower cost of operation caused other nations to ask about purchasing it.

Operators

Current operators

 (Australian Army) Originally 54 systems (M777A2), reduced to 48 after 6 were donated to Ukraine in April 2022.
 (Canadian Army) 33 systems, previously 37 with 4 having been donated to Ukraine. The donated howitzers will be replenished.
 The Colombian Naval Infantry will obtain M777 systems as part of a donation from the United States Marine Corps.
 (Indian Army) 89 systems in service (a total of 145 systems were on order out of which all the remaining 120 systems are being built in India by Mahindra Defence under the "Make in India" program)

 999 systems, 481 for the US Marine Corps and 518 for the US Army and Army National Guard, were acquired. The US fields a "pure fleet" of M777A2 variants. In 2022 108 of the US Marine Corps' systems were donated to Ukraine.
 152 systems (108 of which were donated by the United States along with 200,000 155 mm artillery rounds and 18 in the additional package with 36,000 artillery rounds, 4 systems by Canada, and 6 systems by Australia, following the 2022 Russian invasion of Ukraine). M982 Excalibur precision-guided munitions have also been provided by Canada. An additional donation of 16 M777 by the United States was announced in October 2022.

Potential operators
 : On 5 May 2016, BAE Systems confirmed that it is working with Emirates Defense Technology (EDT) to develop a self-propelled version of the M777 howitzer for the UAE Armed Forces.

Gallery

See also
 152 mm howitzer 2A65
 Soltam M-71
 List of howitzers
 SLWH Pegasus
 Norinco AH4 155 mm howitzer
 Cannon-launched guided projectile

References

External links

 Global Security
 Canadian American Strategic Review
 37 additional M777 for Canadian Forces

155 mm artillery
Articles containing video clips
Artillery of the United States
BAE Systems weapons systems
Howitzers
Post–Cold War artillery of the United Kingdom
Military equipment introduced in the 2000s